The Miss Perú 1969 pageant was held on June 29, 1969. That year, 20 candidates were competing for the national crown. The chosen winner represented Peru at the Miss Universe 1969. The rest of the finalists would enter in different pageants.

Placements

Special Awards

 Best Regional Costume - Moquegua - Vilma Villafuerte
 Miss Photogenic - Puno - Sandra Manrique 
 Best Hair - USA Perú - Ana Claire Temple
 Miss Congeniality - Ayacucho - Lucía Galarza
 Miss Elegance - La Libertad - María Julia Mantilla Mayer

.

Delegates

Amazonas - Isabel Montenegro 
Áncash - Fabiola Olaya 
Apurímac - Gloria Camila Solorzano 
Ayacucho - Lucia del Pilar Galarza 
Cuzco - Ellie Carrasco
Distrito Capital - Catalina Rizzo 
Europe Perú - Tamara Rosenshein
Huancavelica - Leonora Carmona
Huánuco - Raquel Bendezú  
Ica - Rosalia Buendia 

Junín - Maria del Carmen Souza 
La Libertad - María Julia Mantilla Mayer
Moquegua - Vilma Villafuerte 
Pasco - Laura D'Brot 
Puno - Sandra Manrique  
Region Lima - Araceli Ledesma 
San Martín - Betina Olortegui
Tacna  - Rossana Oviedo 
Tumbes - Maria Luisa Zorrilla
USA Perú - Ana Claire Temple 

.

References 

Miss Peru
1969 in Peru
1969 beauty pageants